Kim Jang-mi (Hangul: 김장미; ; born September 25, 1992 in Incheon, South Korea) is a South Korean female sport shooter. At the 2012 Summer Olympics, she competed in the Women's 10 metre air pistol and the Women's 25 metre pistol.
On August 1, 2012 Kim Jang-mi won the women's 25 metre pistol gold medal after defeating China's defending champion Chen Ying.

See also
List of Olympic medalists in shooting
List of Youth Olympic Games gold medalists who won Olympic gold medals

References

South Korean female sport shooters
Living people
1992 births
Olympic shooters of South Korea
Shooters at the 2012 Summer Olympics
Shooters at the 2016 Summer Olympics
Shooters at the 2010 Summer Youth Olympics
Olympic gold medalists for South Korea
Olympic medalists in shooting
Medalists at the 2012 Summer Olympics
Asian Games medalists in shooting
Shooters at the 2014 Asian Games
Sportspeople from Incheon
Asian Games gold medalists for South Korea
Medalists at the 2014 Asian Games
South Korean Buddhists
Youth Olympic gold medalists for South Korea
21st-century South Korean women